The 2006 United States House of Representatives elections in Arkansas were held on November 4, 2006, to determine who will represent the state of Arkansas in the United States House of Representatives. Arkansas has four seats in the House, apportioned according to the 2000 United States Census. Representatives are elected for two-year terms. Every incumbent won re-election easily.

Overview

District 1

 

Incumbent Democrat Marion Berry defeated Republican Stubby Stumbaugh, who was the Mayor of Cabot, Arkansas. This district covers the northeast part of the state.

District 2 

 

Incumbent Democrat Vic Snyder defeated Republican Andy Mayberry. This district covers central Arkansas.

District 3 

 

Incumbent Republican John Boozman defeated Democrat Woodrow Anderson, businessman and member of the U.S. Army Reserve. This district covers the northwest corner of the state.

District 4 

 

Incumbent Democrat Mike Ross defeated Republican Joe Ross. This district is roughly the southwest half of the state.

References 

2006 Arkansas elections
Arkansas

2006